Craters of the Sac is a semi-official, MP3-only album by the American rock band Ween, released in 1999 for free via the internet.

Background
Because Elektra Records released Paintin' the Town Brown, which was intended to be Ween's first online independent release, Dean Ween leaked the album to the Internet in 1999; Stereogum described it as a "fan-appreciation comp", and AllMusic described it as a "semi-sanctioned boot".

"Put the Coke on My Dick" and "Monique the Freak" came of The Mollusk sessions of 1997. "Suckin' Blood from the Devil's Dick" is a Chocolate and Cheese outtake from 1993.

The tracks "Big Fat Fuck", "How High Can You Fly?" and "Monique the Freak" later appeared in slightly different forms on Ween's 2005 compilation Shinola, Vol. 1.

The album cover features a close-up photo of Dean Ween's testicles.

Track listing
All tracks written by Ween.

References

1999 albums
Ween albums
Albums free for download by copyright owner